Mauves-sur-Loire (literally Mauves on Loire) is a commune in the Loire-Atlantique department in western France.

Population

International relations
Mauves-sur-Loire is twinned with Hythe in England.

See also
Communes of the Loire-Atlantique department

References

Communes of Loire-Atlantique